The Verran Ministry was the 47th Ministry of the Government of South Australia, led by John Verran of the Labor Party. It commenced on 3 June 1910, following the Labor victory at the 1910 state election. It was succeeded by the Second Peake Ministry on 17 February 1912 following the defeat of the Verran government at the 1912 election.

Notes

 The responsibility for the Northern Territory was transferred from the Government of South Australia to the Government of Australia on 31 December 1910.

References

Australian Labor Party ministries in South Australia
South Australian ministries